Tommy Preben Lehmann (sometimes shown as Lehman, born February 3, 1964) is a Swedish retired professional ice hockey centre. 

Lehmann played for AIK in the Swedish Elitserien for five seasons from 1982 to 1987. Selected by the Boston Bruins of the National Hockey League in the 1982 NHL Entry Draft, he joined Boston for the 1987–88 season, and played nine games that season, and a further 26 games the following season, spending most of those two years playing for the Bruins' American Hockey League affiliate Maine Mariners. He was traded to the Edmonton Oilers before the 1989–90 season, but played in only one game for the club. Lehmann played in 19 regular season games and 6 playoff games for the Cape Breton Oilers before returning to Sweden. Lehmann played for seven more years in the Elitserien, mostly for AIK, but also for MODO for one season, and one game for Södertälje in his final season, before retiring in 1997.

Internationally Lehmann played for the Swedish national junior team at the 1983 and 1984 World Junior Championships.

Family
His son, Niclas Lehmann (born January 5, 1990), also plays hockey.

Career statistics

Regular season and playoffs

International

References

External links

1964 births
Living people
AIK IF players
Boston Bruins draft picks
Boston Bruins players
Cape Breton Oilers players
Edmonton Oilers players
Maine Mariners players
Montreal Canadiens scouts
Modo Hockey players
Södertälje SK players
Ice hockey people from Stockholm
Swedish ice hockey centres